Dinos Iliopoulos (12 June 1913 – 4 June 2001) was a Greek actor. He was one of the most prevalent film/theater actors in Greece.

Biography
He was born in Alexandria, Egypt in 1915. A few years later his family moved to Marseille and there he finished high school. He permanently relocated to Greece in 1935 at the age of 22 started styding at the Berkshire High Commercial School in Athens and also studied acting at the Drama School of Giannoulis Sarantidis. In 1944, he made his stage debut at the Katerina Andreadi Theatre with the play of Leo Lenz's Lady I Love You, and in cinema he debuted in 1948 in the film 100,000 Pounds. In 1963, he became theatrical entrepreneur founded his own theatre Gloria at Ippokratous Street in Athens.

He played in more than 70 films, usually as leading actor. In 1956 he starred in the film O Drakos (The Ogre of Athens) that is considered as one of the ten best Greek films of all times by Greek Film Critics Association. Other important roles of his were in the films Ζiteitai Pseftis, Thanasakis o Politevomenos, Makrykostaioi kai Kondogiorgides, O Atsidas, To Koroidaki tis Despoinidas, Kyries tis Avlis, Stournara 288, My Friend Lefterakis and others.

In 1970s, Ntinos Iliopoulos was relocated in USA and Canada for about two years due to his financial difficulties at where was playing various theatrical plays travelling in different states. In 1963, he married Austrian dancer Hildegard Iliopoulou (1941-2008) with whom he had two daughters, Evita Iliopoulou and Hilda Iliopoulou. He had one granddaughter Nikita from his daughter Evita, and one granddaughter Elli and one grandson Ntinos from his daughter Hilda. After being hospitalized for a long time he died on 4 June 2001 at age of 87. He was buried at First Cemetery of Athens at public expense on 6 June 2001. According to his wish on his cemetery grave there is a plaque writes "Excuse me ladies that I can not stand up".

Selected filmography

References

Further reading

External links

 Ntinos Iliopoulos at cine.gr
 at retrodb.gr
 at discogs.gr

1915 births
2001 deaths
Greek comedians
20th-century Greek male actors
Greek male stage actors
People from Alexandria
Greek male film actors
20th-century comedians
Egyptian emigrants to France
French emigrants to Greece
Male actors from Marseille